"Run to Me" is a song by the Bee Gees, the lead single and first track on the group's album To Whom It May Concern (1972). The song reached the UK Top 10 and the US Top 20.

Written by Barry, Robin and Maurice Gibb. Lead vocals by Barry Gibb on the verses and Robin Gibb on the chorus. Barry re-recorded the song as a duet with Brandi Carlile for his 2021 album Greenfields.

Writing and recording

Robin recalled, "We recorded 'Run to Me' and Andy Williams cut it on his LP. If Andy Williams came up to us and said write a song and we wrote 'Run to Me' for him, he probably wouldn't have recorded it. But we recorded it and then he recorded it."

"Run to Me" was recorded on 12 April 1972 at London's IBC Studios, on the same day as "Bad Bad Dreams" and "Please Don't Turn Out The Lights". It was very much in the mold of the last two successful singles, "Don't Wanna Live Inside Myself" and "My World". The song has a straight verse-chorus number with vocal by both Barry and Robin. Maurice sings in a very low key along with Robin in the chorus which is barely audible, something he rarely did in concert when they performed this song.

Release and live performances
Released on 7 July 1972, "Run to Me" saw the Bee Gees return to the UK Top 10 after a three-year absence, climbing to number 9, while in the US it reached number 16. The first Bee Gees single without drummer Geoff Bridgford as he left the band in January that year.

Cash Box said that the song "features [the Bee Gees'] best chorus in years."

A promotional video for this song was filmed in black and white, featuring Barry and Robin singing in front of Maurice's grand piano.

Chart performance

Weekly charts

Year-end charts

Personnel 

Barry Gibb – lead vocal, acoustic guitar
Robin Gibb – lead and harmony vocals
Maurice Gibb – harmony vocals, bass, piano, acoustic guitar
Clem Cattini – drums
Alan Kendall – lead guitar
Bill Shepherd – orchestral arrangement

Cover versions 

 Dionne Warwick and Barry Manilow released a version in 1985, which reached number 12 in the US Adult Contemporary chart and at number 86 in the UK. The song was included on Warwick's studio album Finder of Lost Loves.
 Anita Meyer and Lee Towers made it a top 10 hit in the Netherlands in late 1985.
 Oscar De La Hoya's version, from his 2000 self-titled album, peaked at number 23 on the Adult Contemporary, while the Spanish version, "Ven a Mi", peaked at number 1 on the Hot Latin Songs chart.
 Alternative rock artist Matthew Sweet and Bangles singer/guitarist Susanna Hoffs covered the song on their 2006 duet album Under the Covers, Vol. 1

See also
List of number-one Billboard Hot Latin Tracks of 2000

References

 

1972 singles
Polydor Records singles
Philips Records singles
1972 songs
Bee Gees songs
Demis Roussos songs
Dionne Warwick songs
Songs written by Maurice Gibb
Songs written by Robin Gibb
Songs written by Barry Gibb
Rock ballads
Song recordings produced by Barry Gibb
Song recordings produced by Robin Gibb
Song recordings produced by Maurice Gibb
Song recordings produced by Robert Stigwood